Emmanuel Fernandez is the name of:

Emmanuel Fernandez (ice hockey), Canadian hockey player
Emmanuel Fernandez (footballer), English footballer
Emmanuel Fernandez (wrestler), American wrestler

See also
Emmanuel Fernandes Francou, Argentine footballer